Apollonius Glaucus (Greek: Ἀπολλώνιος Γλαῦκος) was a physician and writer who must have lived during or before the 2nd century CE, as his work On Internal Diseases is quoted by Caelius Aurelianus. Nothing more is known of his life. He wrote, for instance, on the significance of the types of excreted worms.

Name
The name Glaucus comes from Greek mythology, including one sea-god.

References

1st-century Greek physicians
Year of birth unknown
Year of death unknown
2nd-century Greek physicians